Niu Lijie  (born 12 April 1969) is a Chinese former football player who played for the China women's national football team. She represented China at the 1996 Summer Olympics and the inaugural 1991 FIFA Women's World Cup.

See also
 China at the 1996 Summer Olympics

References

External links

 

1969 births
Living people
Chinese women's footballers
Place of birth missing (living people)
Footballers at the 1996 Summer Olympics
Olympic footballers of China
Asian Games medalists in football
Footballers at the 1990 Asian Games
Footballers at the 1994 Asian Games
1991 FIFA Women's World Cup players
China women's international footballers
1995 FIFA Women's World Cup players
Asian Games gold medalists for China
Women's association football defenders
Medalists at the 1990 Asian Games
Medalists at the 1994 Asian Games